Majdel Balhis  (مجدل بلهيص)  is a village and municipality located in Rashaya District, Beqaa Governorate, Lebanon. Majdel Balhis is 95 km away from Beirut. Its altitude is 1100 meters above sea level. The area of Majdel Balhis covers 2004  hectares. Majdel Balhis is located on the western slopes of Mount Hermon.

Majdel Balhis has a large expatriate community in Ottawa in Canada, and the first mosque in that city was founded by a group people from Mejdal Balhis.

In 1838, Eli Smith noted Mejdel Belhis as a village in the Beqaa Valley.

References

Bibliography

 

Populated places in Rashaya District